Carlo Spirito (1 May 1920 – June 2009) was an Italian sailor. He competed at the 1952 Summer Olympics and the 1956 Summer Olympics.

References

External links
 

1920 births
2009 deaths
Italian male sailors (sport)
Olympic sailors of Italy
Sailors at the 1952 Summer Olympics – Dragon
Sailors at the 1956 Summer Olympics – 5.5 Metre
People from Savona
Sportspeople from the Province of Savona